Somerville Island is a small island  southwest of Berthelot Islands and  northwest of Darboux Island, in the Wilhelm Archipelago, off the west coast of the Antarctic Peninsula in Antarctica. Discovered by the French Antarctic Expedition, 1908–1910, under Charcot, and named by him for Crichton Somerville, a resident of Oslo, Norway, who selected and supervised the making of much of the polar clothing and equipment used by the expedition.

See also 
 List of Antarctic and sub-Antarctic islands

Islands of the Wilhelm Archipelago